XTRMST is the debut studio album by the hardcore project XTRMST. It was released on November 18, 2014, through Dim Mak Records, the label founded by Steve Aoki. Three singles were released from the album; "Conformist" was the lead single, followed by "Exterminate" and "Dirty Nails". A music video was produced for "Conformist".

Track listing

References 

2014 debut albums
XTRMST albums
Dim Mak Records albums